The Stade de Port-Gentil is a stadium in Port-Gentil, Gabon. This 20,000 capacity stadium  opened in time for its use in the 2017 Africa Cup of Nations.

References

Football venues in Gabon
Athletics (track and field) venues in Gabon
2017 Africa Cup of Nations stadiums
Sports venues completed in 2015